The 1987–88 Boston Celtics season was the 42nd season of the Boston Celtics in the National Basketball Association (NBA). Coming from an NBA Finals defeat to their rivals, the Los Angeles Lakers in six games, the Celtics finished first place in the Eastern Conference with 57 wins and 25 losses, with Larry Bird being selected to the All-NBA First Team. Bird, Kevin McHale and Danny Ainge were all selected for the 1988 NBA All-Star Game. In the first round of the playoffs, they defeated the New York Knicks in four games. In the semi-finals, the Celtics trailed 3–2 to Dominique Wilkins and the Atlanta Hawks, but won the final two games. They advanced to the Eastern Conference Finals for the fifth consecutive time, becoming the first team to do so since the 1968–69 Boston Celtics (which reached the previous thirteen). However, they would lose to Isiah Thomas and the 2nd-seeded Detroit Pistons in six games.

Draft picks

Roster

Roster Notes
 Center Bill Walton missed the entire season due to a right foot injury.

Regular season

Season standings

Record vs. opponents

Game log

Regular season

|- style="background:#cfc;"
| 1 || November 6, 1987 || Milwaukee
| W 125–108
|
|
|
| Boston Garden
| 1–0
|- style="background:#cfc;"
| 2 || November 7, 1987 || @ Washington
| W 140–139 (2 OT)
|
|
|
| Capital Centre
| 2–0
|- style="background:#cfc;"
| 3 || November 9, 1987 || @ New York
| W 96–87
|
|
|
| Madison Square Garden
| 3–0
|- style="background:#cfc;"
| 4 || November 11, 1987 || Indiana
| W 120–106
|
|
|
| Boston Garden
| 4–0
|- style="background:#cfc;"
| 5 || November 13, 1987 || Cleveland
| W 128–114
|
|
|
| Boston Garden
| 5–0
|- style="background:#cfc;"
| 6 || November 15, 1987 || @ Indiana
| W 103–98
|
|
|
| Market Square Arena
| 6–0
|- style="background:#fcc;"
| 7 || November 17, 1987 || @ Cleveland
| L 88–109
|
|
|
| Richfield Coliseum
| 6–1
|- style="background:#cfc;"
| 8 || November 18, 1987 || New York
| W 111–109 (2OT)
|
|
|
| Boston Garden
| 7–1
|- style="background:#fcc;"
| 9 || November 20, 1987 || @ Philadelphia
| L 85–116
|
|
|
| The Spectrum
| 7–2
|- style="background:#cfc;"
| 10 || November 21, 1987 || @ New Jersey
| W 107–97
|
|
|
| Brendan Byrne Arena
| 8–2
|- style="background:#fcc;"
| 11 || November 23, 1987 || Chicago
| L 102–107
|
|
|
| Hartford Civic Center
| 8–3
|- style="background:#cfc;"
| 12 || November 25, 1987 || Atlanta
| W 117–102
|
|
|
| Boston Garden
| 9–3
|- style="background:#cfc;"
| 13 || November 27, 1987 || Seattle
| W 117–112
|
|
|
| Boston Garden
| 10–3
|- style="background:#fcc;"
| 14 || November 28, 1987 || @ Milwaukee
| L 97–112
|
|
|
| MECCA Arena
| 10–4

|- style="background:#fcc;"
| 15 || December 1, 1987 || @ Atlanta
| L 106–120
|
|
|
| The Omni
| 10–5
|- style="background:#cfc;"
| 16 || December 2, 1987 || New Jersey
| W 130–99
|
|
|
| Boston Garden
| 11–5
|- style="background:#fcc;"
| 17 || December 4, 19877:30 PM EST || @ Detroit
| L 105–128
|
|
|
| Pontiac Silverdome34,523
| 11–6
|- style="background:#fcc;"
| 18 || December 9, 1987 || Denver
| L 119–124
|
|
|
| Boston Garden
| 11–7
|- style="background:#fcc;"
| 19 || December 11, 19878:00 PM EST || L.A. Lakers
| L 114–115
| Bird (35)
| Bird & Parish (9)
| Bird (8)
| Boston Garden14,890
| 11–8
|- style="background:#cfc;"
| 20 || December 15, 1987 || @ Washington
| W 122–102
|
|
|
| Capital Centre
| 12–8
|- style="background:#cfc;"
| 21 || December 16, 1987 || Utah
| W 121–111
|
|
|
| Boston Garden
| 13–8
|- style="background:#cfc;"
| 22 || December 20, 1987 || Philadelphia
| W 124–87
|
|
|
| Boston Garden
| 14–8
|- style="background:#cfc;"
| 23 || December 22, 1987 || @ Philadelphia
| W 118–115
|
|
|
| The Spectrum
| 15–8
|- style="background:#cfc;"
| 24 || December 26, 1987 || @ L.A. Clippers
| W 106–97
|
|
|
| Los Angeles Memorial Sports Arena
| 16–8
|- style="background:#cfc;"
| 25 || December 27, 1987 || @ Sacramento
| W 114–102
|
|
|
| ARCO Arena
| 17–8
|- style="background:#fcc;"
| 26 || December 30, 1987 || @ Seattle
| L 105–111
|
|
|
| Seattle Center Coliseum
| 17–9

|- style="background:#cfc;"
| 27 || January 2, 1988 || @ Golden State
| W 115–110
|
|
|
| Oakland-Alameda County Coliseum Arena
| 18–9
|- style="background:#cfc;"
| 28 || January 4, 1988 || @ Utah
| W 107–99
|
|
|
| Salt Palace
| 19–9
|- style="background:#cfc;"
| 29 || January 6, 1988 || New York
| W 117–108
|
|
|
| Boston Garden
| 20–9
|- style="background:#cfc;"
| 30 || January 8, 1988 || Washington
| W 125–109
|
|
|
| Boston Garden
| 21–9
|- style="background:#fcc;"
| 31 || January 9, 1988 || @ New York
| L 98–106
|
|
|
| Madison Square Garden
| 21–10
|- style="background:#cfc;"
| 32 || January 12, 1988 || @ Chicago
| W 104–97
|
|
|
| Chicago Stadium
| 22–10
|- style="background:#cfc;"
| 33 || January 13, 19887:30 PM EST || Detroit
| W 143–105
|
|
|
| Boston Garden14,890
| 23–10
|- style="background:#cfc;"
| 34 || January 15, 1988 || Sacramento
| W 122–86
|
|
|
| Boston Garden
| 24–10
|- style="background:#cfc;"
| 35 || January 16, 1988 || @ New Jersey
| W 103–96
|
|
|
| Brendan Byrne Arena
| 25–10
|- style="background:#cfc;"
| 36 || January 18, 1988 || Golden State
| W 121–101
|
|
|
| Boston Garden
| 26–10
|- style="background:#cfc;"
| 37 || January 20, 1988 || Phoenix
| W 131–115
|
|
|
| Boston Garden
| 27–10
|- style="background:#cfc;"
| 38 || January 22, 1988 || Atlanta
| W 124–106
|
|
|
| Boston Garden
| 28–10
|- style="background:#fcc;"
| 39 || January 23, 1988 || @ Cleveland
| L 100–119
|
|
|
| Richfield Coliseum
| 28–11
|- style="background:#cfc;"
| 40 || January 26, 1988 || @ Atlanta
| W 102–97
|
|
|
| The Omni
| 29–11
|- style="background:#cfc;:
| 41 || January 27, 1988 || Washington
| W 106–100
|
|
|
| Boston Garden
| 30–11
|- style="background:#fcc;"
| 42 || January 29, 19888:00 PM EST || @ Detroit
| L 108–125
|
|
|
| Pontiac Silverdome61,983
| 30–12
|- style="background:#cfc;"
| 43 || January 31, 1988 || Philadelphia
| W 100–85
|
|
|
| Boston Garden
| 31–12

|- style="background:#cfc;"
| 44 || February 3, 1988 || Indiana
| W 118–103
|
|
|
| Boston Garden
| 32–12
|- style="background:#fcc;"
| 45 || February 4, 1988 || @ Milwaukee
| L 101–111
|
|
|
| MECCA Arena
| 32–13
|- style="background:#fcc;"
| 46 || February 9, 1988 || @ Houston
| L 120–129
|
|
|
| The Summit
| 32–14
|- style="background:#cfc;"
| 47 || February 10, 1988 || @ San Antonio
| W 139–120
|
|
|
| HemisFair Arena
| 33–14
|- style="background:#cfc;"
| 48 || February 12, 19888:30 PM EST || @ Dallas
| W 105–104
|
|
|
| Reunion Arena17,007
| 34–14
|- style="background:#fcc;"
| 49 || February 14, 19883:30 PM EST || @ L.A. Lakers
| L 106–115
| Bird (25)
| Bird (17)
| Johnson (10)
| The Forum17,505
| 34–15
|- style="background:#cfc;"
| 50 || February 15, 1988 || @ Phoenix
| W 107–106
|
|
|
| Arizona Veterans Memorial Coliseum
| 35–15
|- style="background:#fcc;"
| 51 || February 17, 1988 || @ Denver
| L 125–138
|
|
|
| McNichols Sports Arena
| 35–16
|- style="background:#cfc;"
| 52 || February 19, 1988 || @ Portland
| W 124–104
|
|
|
| Memorial Coliseum
| 36–16
|- style="background:#cfc;"
| 53 || February 22, 1988 || New York
| W 95–93
|
|
|
| Hartford Civic Center
| 37–16
|- style="background:#cfc;"
| 54 || February 24, 1988 || Portland
| W 113–112
|
|
|
| Boston Garden
| 38–16
|- style="background:#cfc;"
| 55 || February 26, 1988 || Milwaukee
| W 132–96
|
|
|
| Boston Garden
| 39–16
|- style="background:#fcc;"
| 56 || February 28, 198812 Noon PM EST || @ Detroit
| L 101–106
|
|
|
| Pontiac Silverdome37,462
| 39–17

|- style="background:#fcc;"
| 57 || March 1, 1988 || @ Milwaukee
| L 116–117
|
|
|
| MECCA Arena
| 39–18
|- style="background:#fcc;"
| 58 || March 2, 1988 || New Jersey
| L 107–117
|
|
|
| Boston Garden
| 39–19
|- style="background:#cfc;"
| 59 || March 4, 1988 || L.A. Clippers
| W 121–90
|
|
|
| Boston Garden
| 40–19
|- style="background:#cfc;"
| 60 || March 6, 1988 || Cleveland
| W 127–98
|
|
|
| Boston Garden
| 41–19
|- style="background:#cfc;"
| 61 || March 9, 1988 || San Antonio
| W 117–116
|
|
|
| Boston Garden
| 42–19
|- style="background:#cfc;"
| 62 || March 11, 1988 || Indiana
| W 122–112
|
|
|
| Hartford Civic Center
| 43–19
|- style="background:#cfc;"
| 63 || March 13, 1988 || Atlanta
| W 117–100
|
|
|
| Boston Garden
| 44–19
|- style="background:#cfc;"
| 64 || March 15, 1988 || @ Indiana
| W 119–113
|
|
|
| Market Square Arena
| 45–19
|- style="background:#fcc;"
| 65 || March 18, 1988 || @ Chicago
| L 103–113
|
|
|
| Chicago Stadium
| 45–20
|- style="background:#cfc;"
| 66 || March 20, 1988 || Chicago
| W 137–107
|
|
|
| Boston Garden
| 46–20
|- style="background:#cfc;"
| 67 || March 23, 1988 || Washington
| W 104–89
|
|
|
| Boston Garden
| 47–20
|- style="background:#fcc;"
| 68 || March 25, 1988 || Philadelphia
| L 93–97
|
|
|
| Boston Garden
| 47–21
|- style="background:#cfc;"
| 69 || March 26, 1988 || @ New York
| W 118–106
|
|
|
| Madison Square Garden
| 48–21
|- style="background:#cfc;"
| 70 || March 28, 1988 || @ New Jersey
| W 106–105
|
|
|
| Brendan Byrne Arena
| 49–21
|- style="background:#cfc;"
| 71 || March 30, 1988 || Houston
| W 117–110
|
|
|
| Boston Garden
| 50–21

|- style="background:#cfc;"
| 72 || April 1, 19888:00 PM EST || Detroit
| W 121–110
|
|
|
| Boston Garden14,890
| 51–21
|- style="background:#cfc;"
| 73 || April 3, 19881:00 PM EDT || Dallas
| W 110–101
|
|
|
| Boston Garden14,890
| 52–21
|- style="background:#cfc;"
| 74 || April 8, 1988 || New Jersey
| W 127–90
|
|
|
| Boston Garden
| 53–21
|- style="background:#cfc;"
| 75 || April 10, 1988 || @ Philadelphia
| W 117–108
|
|
|
| The Spectrum
| 54–21
|- style="background:#cfc;"
| 76 || April 13, 1988 || Milwaukee
| W 123–104
|
|
|
| Boston Garden
| 55–21
|- style="background:#fcc;"
| 77 || April 15, 1988 || @ Cleveland
| L 109–120
|
|
|
| Richfield Coliseum
| 55–22
|- style="background:#fcc;"
| 78 || April 17, 1988 || @ Washington
| L 92–98
|
|
|
| Capital Centre
| 55–23
|- style="background:#cfc;"
| 79 || April 19, 19887:30 PM EDT || Detroit
| W 121–110
|
|
|
| Boston Garden14,890
| 56–23
|- style="background:#cfc;"
| 80 || April 21, 1988 || Chicago
| W 126–119
|
|
|
| Boston Garden
| 57–23
|- style="background:#fcc;"
| 81 || April 22, 1988 || @ Atlanta
| L 106–133
|
|
|
| The Omni
| 57–24
|- style="background:#fcc;"
| 82 || April 24, 1988 || @ Chicago
| L 108–115
|
|
|
| Chicago Stadium
| 57–25

Playoffs

|- align="center" bgcolor="#ccffcc"
| 1 || April 29 || New York
| W 112–92
| McHale, Bird (29)
| Robert Parish (13)
| Dennis Johnson (9)
| Boston Garden14,890
| 1–0
|- style="background:#cfc"
| 2 || May 1 || New York
| W 128–102
| Larry Bird (36)
| Kevin McHale (12)
| Dennis Johnson (9)
| Boston Garden14,890
| 2–0
|- align="center" bgcolor="#ffcccc"
| 3 || May 4 || @ New York
| L 100–109
| Kevin McHale (24)
| Robert Parish (11)
| Larry Bird (12)
| Madison Square Garden19,591
| 2–1
|- align="center" bgcolor="#ccffcc"
| 4 || May 6 || @ New York
| W 102–94
| Larry Bird (28)
| Robert Parish (12)
| Dennis Johnson (12)
| Madison Square Garden19,591
| 3–1
|-

|- align="center" bgcolor="#ccffcc"
| 1 || May 11 || Atlanta
| W 110–101
| Larry Bird (38)
| Robert Parish (14)
| Danny Ainge (12)
| Boston Garden14,890
| 1–0
|- align="center" bgcolor="#ccffcc"
| 2 || May 13 || Atlanta
| W 108–97
| Kevin McHale (32)
| Robert Parish (14)
| Dennis Johnson (9)
| Boston Garden14,890
| 2–0
|- align="center" bgcolor="#ffcccc"
| 3 || May 15 || @ Atlanta
| L 92–110
| Larry Bird (22)
| Robert Parish (13)
| Larry Bird (8)
| Omni Coliseum16,451
| 2–1
|- align="center" bgcolor="#ffcccc"
| 4 || May 16 || @ Atlanta
| L 109–118
| Larry Bird (30)
| Kevin McHale (12)
| Dennis Johnson (10)
| Omni Coliseum16,451
| 2–2
|- align="center" bgcolor="#ffcccc"
| 5 || May 18 || Atlanta
| L 104–112
| Robert Parish (24)
| Robert Parish (13)
| Dennis Johnson (10)
| Boston Garden14,890
| 2–3
|- align="center" bgcolor="#ccffcc"
| 6 || May 20 || @ Atlanta
| W 102–100
| Kevin McHale (26)
| Larry Bird (11)
| Danny Ainge (14)
| Omni Coliseum16,451
| 3–3
|- align="center" bgcolor="#ccffcc"
| 7 || May 22 || Atlanta
| W 118–116
| Larry Bird (34)
| Kevin McHale (13)
| Danny Ainge (10)
| Boston Garden14,890
| 4–3
|-

|- align="center" bgcolor="#ffcccc"
| 1 || May 25, 19888:00 PM EDT || Detroit
| L 96–104
| Kevin McHale (31)
| Robert Parish (13)
| Dennis Johnson (10)
| Boston Garden14,890
| 0–1
|- align="center" bgcolor="#ccffcc"
| 2 || May 26, 19888:00 PM EDT || Detroit
| W 119–115 (2OT)
| Robert Parish (26)
| Larry Bird (12)
| Dennis Johnson (10)
| Boston Garden14,890
| 1–1
|- align="center" bgcolor="#ffcccc"
| 3 || May 28, 19883:30 PM EDT || @ Detroit
| L 94–98
| Kevin McHale (32)
| Larry Bird (11)
| Larry Bird (8)
| Pontiac Silverdome26,481
| 1–2
|- align="center" bgcolor="#ccffcc"
| 4 || May 30, 19883:00 PM EDT || @ Detroit
| W 79–78
| Larry Bird (20)
| Larry Bird (10)
| Johnson, Bird (6)
| Pontiac Silverdome26,625
| 2–2
|- align="center" bgcolor="#ffcccc"
| 5 || June 1, 19888:00 PM EDT || Detroit
| L 96–102 (OT)
| Larry Bird (27)
| Larry Bird (17)
| Dennis Johnson (8)
| Boston Garden14,890
| 2–3
|- align="center" bgcolor="#ffcccc"
| 6 || June 3, 19889:00 PM EST || @ Detroit
| L 90–95
| Kevin McHale (33)
| Larry Bird (14)
| Dennis Johnson (9)
| Pontiac Silverdome38,912
| 2–4
|-

Player statistics

Season

Playoffs
The Celtics would end up losing to the Detroit Pistons in the conference finals as an aging Celtics team was beginning to falter against a younger and fresher pistons team. This would be the first time in 5 years that the Celtics would not make it to the finals and would not return to another finals until 2008.

Awards and records
 Larry Bird, All-NBA First Team
 Kevin McHale, NBA All-Defensive First Team

Transactions

References

 Celtics on Database Basketball
 Celtics on Basketball Reference

See also
 1987–88 NBA season

Boston Celtics seasons
Boston Celtics
Boston Celtics
Boston Celtics
Celtics
Celtics